Denis Kudla was the defending champion but chose not to defend his title.

Mitchell Krueger won the title after defeating Ramkumar Ramanathan 7–6(7–4), 6–2 in the final.

Seeds

Draw

Finals

Top half

Bottom half

References

External links
Main draw
Qualifying draw

Cary Challenger - 1
2021 Singles